Andrzej Zajączkowski (27 May 1922, in Lublin – 16 December 1994, in Warsaw) was a Polish sociologist, cultural anthropologist, and Africanist. In 1978 he was made professor of the Polish Academy of Sciences and the University of Warsaw; he became the director of the Center for Studies on Non-European Countries (Polish Academy of Sciences) in 1981. He specialized in historical sociology and the sociology of developing countries. He lectured at universities in Ghana and Uganda.

Works 

His most notable works include
 Główne elementy kultury szlacheckiej w Polsce. Ideologia a struktury społeczne (1961)
 Niepodległość Konga a kolonializm belgijski (1968)
 Muntu dzisiaj. Studium afrykanistyczne (1970)
 Szlachta polska. Kultura i struktura (1993).

References

1922 births
1994 deaths
Polish Africanists
Writers from Lublin
Polish anthropologists
Cultural anthropologists
Polish sociologists
20th-century anthropologists